Hamed Ameli (born 1977) is an Iranian conservative politician who currently serves as the governor of Ardabil Province.

Education 
Ameli holds a bachelor's degree in industrial engineering and received a PhD in social communication sciences .

References

1977 births
Living people
People from Ardabil
Governors of Ardabil Province